Norbert Tajti (born 7 October 1983) is a Hungarian football player who plays for Dabas–Gyón.

References
 DVTK 
 HLSZ 

1983 births
Living people
People from Marcali
Hungarian footballers
Association football goalkeepers
Jászapáti VSE footballers
Kazincbarcikai SC footballers
Mezőkövesdi SE footballers
Diósgyőri VTK players
BFC Siófok players
Vác FC players
Tiszakécske FC footballers
Nemzeti Bajnokság I players
Nemzeti Bajnokság II players
Nemzeti Bajnokság III players
Sportspeople from Somogy County